Leifur Magnusson (7 July 1882 – 15 February 1960) was an Icelandic American economist with the Bureau of Labor Statistics and the International Labour Organization.

Biography
He was born in Iceland on 7 July 1882. He died in a traffic accident in Claremont, California on 15 February 1960.

References

1960 deaths
1882 births
Icelandic emigrants to the United States
International Labour Organization people
Road incident deaths in California